Von Kármán swirling flow is a flow created by a uniformly rotating infinitely long plane disk, named after Theodore von Kármán who solved the problem in 1921. The rotating disk acts as a fluid pump and is used as a model for centrifugal fans or compressors. This flow is classified under the category of steady flows in which vorticity generated at a solid surface is prevented from diffusing far away by an opposing convection, the other examples being the Blasius boundary layer with suction, stagnation point flow etc.

Flow description 
Consider a planar disk of infinite radius rotating at a constant angular velocity  in fluid which is initially at rest everywhere. Near to the surface, the fluid is being turned by the disk, due to friction, which then causes centrifugal forces which move the fluid outwards. This outward radial motion of the fluid near the disk must be accompanied by an inward axial motion of the fluid towards the disk to conserve mass. Due to symmetry, pressure of the fluid can depend only on radial and axial coordinate .
Then the continuity equation and the incompressible Navier–Stokes equations reduce to

where  is the kinematic viscosity.

No rotation at infinity  

Here the boundary conditions for the fluid  are

Self-similar solution is obtained by introducing following transformation,  

where  is the fluid density.

The self-similar equations are

 

with boundary conditions for the fluid  are

The coupled ordinary differential equations need to be solved numerically and an accurate solution is given by Cochran(1934). Neglecting edge effects, the torque exerted by the fluid on the disk with large but finite radius  is

The factor  is added to account for both sides of the disk.

Rigid body rotation at infinity  
This problem was addressed by George Keith Batchelor(1951). Let  be the angular velocity at infinity.
Then the boundary conditions for the fluid  are

Self-similar solution is obtained by introducing following transformation,

The self-similar equations are

 

with boundary conditions for the fluid  is

The solution is easy to obtain only for  i.e., the fluid at infinity rotates in the same sense as the plate. For , the solution is more complex, in the sense that many-solution branches occur. Evans(1969) obtained solution for the range . The solution of the second branch is continued till , at which point, a third-solution branch is found to emerge. They also discovered an infinity of solution branches around the point .

For  ( represents solid body rotation, the whole fluid rotates at the same speed) the solution reaches the solid body rotation at infinity in an oscillating manner from the plate. There is an explicit solution when .

Nearly rotating at the same speed,  
Therefore, 

To the first order approximation(neglecting ), the self-similar equation  becomes

 

with exact solutions

These solution are similar to an Ekman layer solution.

Non-Axisymmetric solutions 
The flow accepts a non-axisymmetric solution with axisymmetric boundary conditions discovered by Hewitt, Duck and Foster. Defining

and the governing equations are

with boundary conditions

Bödewadt flow
Bödewadt flow describes the flow when a stationary disk is placed in a rotating fluid.

Two rotating coaxial disks  
This problem was addressed by George Keith Batchelor(1951), Keith Stewartson(1952) and many other researchers. Here the solution is not simple, because of the additional length scale imposed in the problem i.e., the distance  between the two disks. In addition, the uniqueness and existence of a steady solution are also depend on the corresponding Reynolds number .
Then the boundary conditions for the fluid  are

Thus, instead of the scalings 

used before, it is convenient to introduce following transformation,

so that the governing equations become

with six boundary conditions

and the pressure is given by

Here boundary conditions are six because pressure is not known either at the top or bottom wall;  is to be obtained as part of solution. It turns out, Stewartson predictions were correct.

Applications 

Von Kármán swirling flow finds its applications in wide range of fields, which includes rotating machines, filtering systems, computer storage devices, heat transfer and mass transfer applications, combustion-related problems, planetary formations, geophysical applications etc.

References

Bibliography

 

Fluid dynamics
Flow regimes